The Federal Employees' Compensation Act (FECA), is a United States federal law, enacted on September 7, 1916. Sponsored by Sen. John W. Kern (D) of Indiana and Rep. Daniel J. McGillicuddy (D) of Maine, it established compensation to federal civil service employees for wages lost due to job-related injuries. This act became the precedent for "disability insurance" across the country and the precursor to broad-coverage health insurance.

President Woodrow Wilson signed H.R. 15316 into law on September 7, 1916.

The Federal Employees' Compensation Commission was the original administrator of the FECA. However, the Commission did not exist at the time the FECA went into effect and claims accumulated for more than six months while members were selected and sworn into office. The Federal Employees' Compensation Commission officially began its duties on March 14, 1917. The commission was abolished on May 16, 1946, by President Harry S. Truman as part of the Reorganization Act of 1939. Its duties were transferred to the Federal Security Agency on July 16, 1946.

The Act is now administered by the U.S. Department of Labor.

References

Presidency of Harry S. Truman
Presidency of Woodrow Wilson
Employee compensation in the United States
1916 in American law
United States federal legislation
United States Department of Labor